Michael Glennon is the name of:

 Mike Glennon, American football quarterback
 Michael J. Glennon, American law professor and author
 Michael Glennon (former priest), Australian former Roman Catholic priest and child abuser

See also
 Glennon